Cherry Grove is an unincorporated community in southern Columbus County, North Carolina, United States, south of Cerro Gordo, and northwest of Tabor City, on North Carolina Highway 904, at an elevation of 102 feet (31 m).

References

Unincorporated communities in Columbus County, North Carolina
Unincorporated communities in North Carolina